Allan Alfred Nunweiler (born December 7, 1930) is a Canadian former politician. He served in the Legislative Assembly of British Columbia from 1972 to 1975, as a NDP member for the constituency of Fort George.

Nunweiler worked as a dispatcher on the CN line from Jasper, Alberta to Prince George, British Columbia for 33 years.

References

1930 births
Living people
British Columbia New Democratic Party MLAs
Canadian National Railway people
Members of the Executive Council of British Columbia
People from Prince George, British Columbia